The Henry Marshall Tory Medal is an award of the Royal Society of Canada "for outstanding research in a branch of astronomy, chemistry, mathematics, physics, or an allied science". It is named in honour of Henry Marshall Tory and is awarded bi-annually. The award consists of a gold plated silver medal.

Recipients
Source:  Royal Society of Canada

See also 

 List of general science and technology awards 
 List of awards named after people

References
 

Canadian science and technology awards
Royal Society of Canada
Awards established in 1943